Allyssa Lyn "Lacey" Lane (born May 20, 1988) is an American professional wrestler currently signed to WWE under the ring name Kayden Carter, performing on the NXT brand. She is a one-time NXT Women's Tag Team Champion with Katana Chance.

Early life
Lane was born to a Jamaican father and Filipino mother. She played basketball at Monroe Community College before transferring to Shaw University.

Professional wrestling career

Early career (2016–2018) 
Lane enrolled in the Team 3D Academy in 2016, and wrestled regularly for a number of different Florida-based independent promotions. Her first public match was a winning effort against Trish Adora for the Go Wrestle promotion in Daytona Beach in August 2016. Lane had a tryout at the WWE Performance Center in February 2017, after which she was offered a developmental contract. However, a physical examination revealed arthritis in her knee, and the contract was rescinded. Lane spent four months rehabbing her knee, and in November 2017 she joined The Crash Lucha Libre in Tijuana, Baja California, Mexico, eventually winning their Women's Championship from Keyra on January 20, 2018. She held the title for 175 days before losing it to Tessa Blanchard in a triple threat match that also included Santana Garrett on July 14, 2018.

WWE (2018–present)

Early years (2018–2020) 

After passing a second physical, Lane signed with WWE in July 2018. Lane took part in that year's Mae Young Classic, defeating Vanessa Kraven in the first round and Taynara Conti in the second round, before being defeated by Meiko Satomura in the quarterfinals. In September 2019, Lane's ring name was changed to Kayden Carter. On the January 29, 2020, episode of NXT, Carter had her first victory on television, defeating Chelsea Green. She was defeated in their rematch on the February 19 episode of NXT.

Teaming with Katana Chance (2020–present) 
On the September 16 episode of NXT, Carter teamed with Kacy Catanzaro in a winning effort against Jessi Kamea and Xia Li. They took part in the 2021 Women's Dusty Rhodes Tag Team Classic tournament, defeating Mercedes Martinez and Toni Storm in the quarterfinals, but were beaten by Dakota Kai and Raquel González in the semifinals. They would then feud with Xia Li after constantly being attacked by her throughout the following weeks. On the March 10 episode of NXT, Carter lost to Li by disqualification after Catanzaro hit the latter with a crutch. The next year, Catanzaro and Carter participated in the 2022 Women's Dusty Rhodes Tag Team Classic where they defeated Diamond Mine's Ivy Nile and Tatum Paxley in the first round, but lost to Kay Lee Ray and Io Shirai in the semifinals. After defeating Yulisa Leon and Valentina Feroz on the April 26 episode of NXT, Chance and Carter pursued the NXT Women's Tag Team Championship where they failed to win the titles at NXT In Your House from Toxic Attraction. After losing, Chance and Carter began a slow heel turn where they failed to become number one contenders for the NXT Women's Tag Team Championship which they lost on the June 28 episode of NXT to Cora Jade and Roxanne Perez. 

Carter and Chance won the vacant NXT Women's Tag Team Championship in a fatal four way elimination match, lastly eliminating Toxic Attraction, on the August 2 episode of NXT, marking Chance's first professional title and Carter's first title in WWE. They defended their titles against Doudrop and Nikki A.S.H. at Worlds Collide, and against Nikkita Lyons and Zoey Stark on the October 25 and November 8 episodes of NXT. On January 8, 2023, Catanzaro and Carter became the longest reigning NXT Women's Tag Team Champions. On the January 24 episode of NXT, they retained against Alba Fyre and Sol Ruca. At NXT Vengeance Day, Carter and Chance lost the NXT Women's Tag Team Championship to Fallon Henley and Kiana James, ending the historic reign at 186 days.

Championships and accomplishments
The Crash Lucha Libre
The Crash Women's Championship (1 time)

 WWE
 NXT Women's Tag Team Championship (1 time) – with Katana Chance

References

External links 

 
 
 
 

1988 births
21st-century professional wrestlers
American female professional wrestlers
American people of Jamaican descent
American professional wrestlers of Filipino descent
Filipino female professional wrestlers
Living people
People from Winter Park, Florida
Shaw University alumni
NXT Women's Tag Team Champions